Cary Coke (née Newton) was a book collector and patron of the British stage. She was the daughter of Sir John Newton of Barrs Court, a member of the House of Commons of England, and mother of Thomas Coke, the 1st Earl of Leicester.

Life 

Cary Coke was the daughter of Sir John Newton, 3rd baronet, of Barrs Court, Gloucestershire. She was born on 9 June 1680. On 3 June, 1696 she married Edward Coke who had inherited the hall and estate of Holkham in Norfolk. They had three sons and two daughters which survived them. Their son, Thomas (1697- 1759), became the 1st Earl of Leicester.

Both Coke and her husband were patrons and enthusiastic for the stage. Mary Pix dedicated her play Queen Catherine to Coke in 1698.

In April 1707 her husband Edward died, and she followed a few months later on 4 August. Her will is held at the National Archives of the United Kingdom. They died with debts exceeding £22,000, and whilst most of their possessions were sold, books valued at £193 6s were kept for their eldest son, Thomas.

Collections 
Both Coke and Edward were book collectors and in 1701 each had a bookplate made. Some of these books are now located at the Holkham library. Some of the Holkham Collection, including 305 English Restoration plays from the Coke collection, was purchased by the Bodleian Library in 1953. The plays in the Coke collection are valuable due to their apparently unaltered condition, with none of the plays having been perfected and no volumes have been disbound to dispose of duplicates.

References 

1680 births
1707 deaths
17th-century English women
English book and manuscript collectors
Coke family